This page is a collection of VFL/AFL games records. The Australian Football League (AFL), known as the Victorian Football League (VFL) until 1990, is the elite national competition in men's Australian rules football. This list only includes home-and-away matches and finals; representative games (i.e. State of Origin or international rules), pre-season and Night Series games are excluded from the totals.

Most VFL/AFL games
Below are the players who have played at least 300 games at VFL/AFL level; this list of players is often colloquially referred to as "the 300 club". Individuals who have participated as a player, coach and/or umpire in 300 league-sanctioned senior games – including home-and-away, pre-season, state representative and international rules games – are awarded life membership of the AFL.

Updated to the end of round 1, 2023.

Club games record holders
Below are the players who hold the record for most games played at their respective clubs.

Updated to the end of round 1, 2023.

VFL/AFL games record holder
Below are the players who have held the record for the most games played at VFL/AFL level, beginning with the first player to reach 100 games.

See also

 List of VFL/AFL players to have played 200 games for one club
 VFL/AFL goalkicking records
 AFL Women's games records

References

Sources
 Most career games at AFL Tables
 Every AFL player at Australian Football

300 games
300 games
300 games